Michele Savonarola (1385 - c.1466) was an Italian physician, humanist and historian. He was professor of practical medicine at Padua before in 1440 becoming court physician to the House of Este at Ferrara.

His grandson was the Dominican Order friar and preacher Girolamo Savonarola.

Works
 Practica maior
 De regimine pregnantium
 De tutte cose se magnano
 De balneis
 Speculum phisionomie
 Del felice progresso
 De nuptiis Batibecho et Seraboca

References

1385 births
1466 deaths
Year of death uncertain
15th-century Italian physicians
Italian Renaissance humanists
15th-century Italian historians
Physicians from Padua